Betula murrayana commonly known as Murray birch is a species of small tree in the Betulaceae family.  It is endemic to Washtenaw County, Michigan.

Description 
Its leaves are  5–11 centimeters × 3–6 centimeters.

Taxonomy 
It was named by Burton V. Barnes and Bruce P. Dancik, in Canadian Journal of Botany 63(2):223-226, in 2011.

References

External links 

murrayana